Du Wei may refer to:
Du Wei (Three Kingdoms) (fl. 190s–220s), official of the Shu Han state in the Three Kingdoms period
Du Chongwei or Du Wei (died 948), general during the Five Dynasties period
Du Wei (diplomat) (1968–2020), Chinese diplomat
Du Wei (footballer) (born 1982), Chinese football player
Du Wei (Water Margin), a character in Water Margin